Thomas Scully (born 14 January 1990) is a New Zealand professional road racing cyclist, who currently rides for UCI WorldTeam . He previously competed on the track; he won the silver medal in the Men's points race at the 2014 UCI Track Cycling World Championships in Cali, Colombia, and the gold medal in the same event at the 2014 Commonwealth Games in Glasgow, Scotland, United Kingdom.

In October 2015, Scully transitioned to the road by joining 's line-up for the 2016 season.

Major results

2012
 3rd Paris–Roubaix Espoirs
2013
 7th Rutland–Melton CiCLE Classic
 10th Overall Tour de Normandie
1st Prologue
2014
 1st  Points race, Commonwealth Games
 2nd  Points race, UCI Track World Championships
 2nd Rutland–Melton CiCLE Classic
2015
 3rd Overall Tour de Normandie
 6th London Nocturne
2016
 1st Stage 3 Boucles de la Mayenne
 2nd Time trial, National Road Championships
2017
 1st Stage 4 Route du Sud
2019
 3rd Road race, National Road Championships

Grand Tour general classification results timeline

References

External links

1990 births
Living people
People educated at Verdon College
New Zealand male cyclists
Cyclists at the 2014 Commonwealth Games
Commonwealth Games gold medallists for New Zealand
Commonwealth Games medallists in cycling
People from Invercargill
21st-century New Zealand people
Medallists at the 2014 Commonwealth Games